"Shining Stars Bless" is the debut single of I've singer Kaori Utatsuki under Geneon Entertainment. It was released on August 1, 2007. The title track was used as the opening theme for the visual novel/anime Nanatsuiro Drops. It reached #23 in the Oricon charts and has sold a total of 5,339 copies in its first week.

Track listing 
Shining Stars Bless—4:35
Composition: Maiko Iuchi
Arrangement: Maiko Iuchi
Lyrics: Kotoko, Kaori Utatsuki
I'm Home: Unplugged—5:17
Composition: Kazuya Takase
Arrangement: Kazuya Takase
Lyrics: Kotoko
Shining Stars Bless: Instrumental—4:35
I'm Home: Unplugged instrumental—5:14

References

2007 debut singles
Kaori Utatsuki songs
Song recordings produced by I've Sound
Songs with lyrics by Kotoko (musician)
2007 songs